Elizabeth Anne Kovachevich (born December 14, 1936) is a senior United States district judge of the United States District Court for the Middle District of Florida.

Education and career 

Born in Canton, Illinois, Kovachevich earned an Associate of Arts degree from St. Petersburg Junior College (now St. Petersburg College) in 1956 and a Bachelor of Business Administration from the University of Miami in 1958. She then earned a Juris Doctor in 1961 from Stetson University College of Law. Kovachevich worked in private law practice in St. Petersburg, Florida from 1961 until 1973, when she was elected a judge of the State of Florida's Sixth Judicial Circuit. Kovachevich was the first female judge on the Sixth Judicial Circuit, and she served as a state judge in Florida until 1982.

Federal judicial service

Failed nomination under Ford 

On June 8, 1976, President Gerald Ford nominated Kovachevich to a seat on a federal district court, according to an October 12, 1976 memo to Ford by his personnel director, Douglas Bennett. The United States Senate never acted on Kovachevich's nomination before Ford's presidency ended. Her nomination was blocked through a custom known as senatorial courtesy because the Democratic Party controlled the Senate, and Florida's Senators, Lawton Chiles and Richard Stone, Democrats, opposed her confirmation. Ford's successor, President Jimmy Carter, elected not to renominate Kovachevich.

Renomination under Reagan 

Kovachevich was nominated by President Ronald Reagan on January 26, 1982, to a seat on the United States District Court for the Middle District of Florida vacated by Judge George C. Young. She was confirmed by the United States Senate on March 4, 1982, and received commission on March 9, 1982. She served as Chief Judge from 1996 to 2002. Kovachevich is based in Tampa, Florida. She assumed senior status on December 14, 2018, her 82nd birthday.

See also 
 Gerald Ford judicial appointment controversies

References

External links
 

1936 births
Living people
University of Miami Business School alumni
Florida state court judges
Judges of the United States District Court for the Middle District of Florida
United States district court judges appointed by Ronald Reagan
20th-century American judges
People from Canton, Illinois
Stetson University College of Law alumni
21st-century American judges
20th-century American women judges
21st-century American women judges